Lei Cidade Limpa (Portuguese for clean city law) is a law of the city of São Paulo, Brazil put into law by proclamation in 2006 that prohibits advertising such as that of outdoor posters. It was proposed by mayor Gilberto Kassab.

15,000 billboards were taken down. Large support from the public was shown for the initiative, in face of private marketing campaigns by certain advertisers for the people to oppose the bans. Following the removal of advertisements, many remarked that they felt like they were in a new city. At the same time, the law created some unexpected social observations.

Vinicius Valvao, a reporter at Folha de S.Paulo, Brazil's largest newspaper, explained in an interview:

The implementation of the law was controversial.  The advertising industry took it worst. Many of the graffiti images which had brought the city an international reputation for artistic innovation were destroyed and others badly damaged, including the officially approved 680 meter-long mural painted by the grafiteiros Os Gêmeos, Nunca and Nina along the 23 de Maio expressway.  At the same time the artists' work was being celebrated in the Street Art exhibition at Tate Modern Gallery in London, with large-scale works by Os Gêmeos and Nunca decorating the Tate Modern's external walls.  This international recognition of the significance of the artists' work led to a re-evaluation in São Paulo of the importance of street art and the impact of the law.  Following a public debate on the subject of what constituted art a registry of street art in São Paulo meriting protection was established by the city.

References 

São Paulo
Brazilian legislation
Advertising in Brazil
2006 in Brazil
2006 in law